Plectreurys castanea is a species of spider. They are found in the United States (southern California).

References

Plectreuridae
Spiders of the United States
Fauna of the California chaparral and woodlands
Spiders described in 1893